Punjab Pharmacy Council is an autonomous body of Punjab Province, established under Drug Act 1967. It is responsible for issuing certification to Pharmacists of Punjab Province in Category-A and for conducting the exams for Category-B, Pharmacy Technicians and their documentation regarding supervising the medical stores and pharmacy. It is affiliated with the Pharmacy Council Pakistan. The Pharmacy Council of Pakistan is the council that handles all the issues related to Pharmacy Education in Pakistan. The approval to Pharmacy Schools / Colleges / Institutes for award of Pharm.D is accredited by the Pharmacy Council of Pakistan. The Pharmaceutical Manufacturing is licensed and monitored by the Federal Government, DRAP (Drug Regulatory Authority of Pakistan), affiliated with the MoNRS (Ministry of National Regulation and Services), Government of Pakistan.

References

Pharmacy organisations in Pakistan
Organisations based in Punjab, Pakistan